Park Avenue was a heritage streetcar station in Charlotte, North Carolina. The former at-grade side platform, which was located next to Park Avenue, was a stop for the Charlotte Trolley in South End and nearby Dilworth neighborhood.

History 
The station began operations on August 30, 1996. Consisting of a platform area along the track, the station operated Thursday through Sunday and then daily on June 28, 2004. After nearly a decade of service, the station was permanently closed on February 6, 2006.The relocation of Bland Street and the already close proximity of East/West Boulevard made Park Avenue redundant and thus unnecessary.  By end of 2006, the side platform and structure was razed; what remains at the former location are some brick and concrete foundation and a stone pattern walkway connecting to Park Avenue.

References

External links

 South End Charlotte

Former Charlotte Area Transit System stations
Park Avenue
Railway stations in the United States opened in 1996
Railway stations closed in 2006
1996 establishments in North Carolina
2006 disestablishments in North Carolina
Demolished railway stations in the United States